New Summerfield Independent School District is a public independent school district based in New Summerfield, Texas (USA).

New Summerfield ISD comprises New Summerfield Elementary School that serves students in grades Pre-K though six and New Summerfield High School that serves grades 7-12.

In 2009, the school district was rated "academically acceptable" by the Texas Education Agency.

The district changed to a four day school week in fall 2022.

References

External links
New Summerfield ISD

School districts in Cherokee County, Texas